The Miss Perú 1997 pageant was held on April, 1997. That year, 24 candidates were competing for the national crown. The chosen winner represented Peru at the Miss Universe 1997. The rest of the finalists would enter in different pageants.

Placements

Special Awards

 Best Regional Costume - Amazonas - Andrea Montenegro
 Miss Photogenic - Madre de Dios - Andrea Suito
 Miss Elegance - Cajamarca - Samantha Elie Retes
 Miss Body - Loreto - Estrella Lizárraga
 Best Hair - Arequipa - Grethel Soza
 Miss Congeniality - Ucayali - Gisela Fuentes
 Most Beautiful Face - Madre de Dios - Andrea Suito 
 Miss Internet - Amazonas - Andrea Montenegro

Delegates

Amazonas - Andrea Montenegro 
Áncash - Claudia Doph
Apurímac - Delly Madrid
Arequipa - Grethel Soza
Ayacucho - Elvira Villa
Cajamarca - Samantha Elie Retes
Cuzco - Paloma La Hoz
Distrito Capital - Giuliana Ventura
Huancavelica - Fiorella Vismara
Huánuco - Ariela Olavarría
Ica - Betzabeth Aedo
Junín - Marta Andersen

La Libertad - Paola Rubio
Lambayeque - Maritza Menchola
Loreto - Estrella Lizárraga
Madre de Dios - Andrea Suito
Moquegua - Olga Medina
Pasco - Juliette Salomón
Piura - Tatiana Velasco
Puno - Claudia Sala
San Martín - Úrsula Zevallos 
Tacna - María Teresa Linares 
Tumbes - María Elena Hoyos
Ucayali - Gisela Fuentes

Judges

 Marisol Crousillat - Production Manager of América Televisión
 Irma Vargas Fuller - Coord. of Misses del Perú Organization
 Javier Blanco - Regional Manager of San Antonio (Mineral water)
 Norka Peralta del Águila - Peruvian Designer
 Angel Tacchino - News Anchorman & TV Journalist
 Benjamin Kreimer - Former President of Miss Peru Org.

Miss World Peru

The Miss World Peru 1997 pageant was held on May 25, 1997, That year, 22 candidates from the regions of Peru were competing for the national crown. The show host by Antonio Vodanovic and Jessica Newton, from "El Pueblo Resort & Convention Center" hotel and were live broadcast by Frecuencia Latina.  The chosen winner represented Peru at Miss World 1997. The rest of the finalists would enter in different pageants.

Placements

MWP Special Awards

 Miss Photogenic - Amazonas - Claudia Luque 
 Miss Fitness - Amazonas - Claudia Luque 
 Miss Elegance - Puno - Mariana Bedoya
 Best Hair - Tumbes - Alejandra Barbosa
 Miss Body - Ancash - Ana Matallana Illich
 Most Beautiful Face - Puno - Mariana Bedoya

MWP Delegates

Amazonas - Claudia Luque 
Áncash - Ana Matallana Illich
Apurímac - Vanessa Sommerkamp
Arequipa - Maria Angela Quesada
Ayacucho - Ana Maria Zimic
Cajamarca - Roxana Basauri
Callao - Claudia Torres
Cuzco - Raquel de Ugarte
Huánuco - Maia Larrañaga 
Ica - Julia Elena Avalos
Junín - Ursula Cervantes

Lambayeque - Nayfi Ruiz
Loreto - Viviana Rengifo
Madre de Dios - Ingrid Pizarro
Moquegua - Angie Kaliman
Pasco - Janis Valdivia
Piura - Geraldine Cateriano
Puno - Mariana Bedoya
San Martín - Lisette Mathey
Tacna - Veronica Bustamante
Tumbes - Alejandra Barbosa
Ucayali - Milena Chavarri

MWP Judges

 Jaime Andrade - Mitsubishi Motors Representative Director
 Astrid Carolina Herrera - Miss World 1984
 Eleazar Molina - Jewel Designer
 María Teresa Braschi  - Peruvian Tv Host
 Carlos Morales - Public Relations Manager of Grupo D' elite
 Paola Dellepiane - Miss Peru 1995
 Dr. Max Álvarez - Plastic Surgeon
 Miguel Velazco - Regional Director of Quimica Suiza S.A
 Jackeline Aguilera - Miss World 1995
 Jack Abugattas - Fashion Designer

MWP Background Music

Opening Show – Miss World Peru Anthem (composed by Coco Tafur)
Swimsuit Competition - Glenn Miller - In The Mood
Evening Gown Competition – Oasis - Wonderwall & Champagne Supernova - (Piano Cover)

References 

Miss Peru
1997 in Peru
1997 beauty pageants